Mugilogobius is a genus of fish in the family Gobiidae. They are found in fresh, brackish and marine water of the Indo-Pacific region. Several of the freshwater species have highly restricted distributions.

Species
There are currently 33 recognized species in this genus:
 Mugilogobius abei (D. S. Jordan & Snyder, 1901) (Abe's mangrove goby) 
 Mugilogobius adeia Larson & Kottelat, 1992
 Mugilogobius amadi (M. C. W. Weber, 1913)
 Mugilogobius cagayanensis (Aurich, 1938)
 Mugilogobius cavifrons (M. C. W. Weber, 1909)
 Mugilogobius chulae (H. M. Smith, 1932) (Yellow-stripe mangrove goby)
 Mugilogobius durbanensis (Barnard, 1927) (Durban mangrove goby)
 Mugilogobius fasciatus Larson, 2001
 Mugilogobius filifer Larson, 2001 (Thread-fin mangrove goby)
 Mugilogobius flavomaculatus S. P. Huang, I. S. Chen, M. N. Yung & K. T. Shao, 2016 
 Mugilogobius fusca (Herre, 1940)
 Mugilogobius fusculus (Nichols, 1951) (Obscure mangrove goby)
 Mugilogobius hitam Larson, Geiger, Hadiaty & Herder, 2014 (Black towuti goby) 
 Mugilogobius karatunensis (Aurich, 1938)
 Mugilogobius latifrons (Boulenger, 1897)
 Mugilogobius lepidotus Larson, 2001
 Mugilogobius littoralis Larson, 2001 (Beach-rock mangrove goby)
 Mugilogobius mertoni (M. C. W. Weber, 1911) (Chequered mangrove goby)
 Mugilogobius myxodermus (Herre, 1935)
 Mugilogobius notospilus (Günther, 1877) (Freshwater mangrove goby)
 Mugilogobius nuicocensis V. H. Nguyễn & V. B. Vo, 2005
 Mugilogobius paludis (Whitley, 1930)
 Mugilogobius platynotus (Günther, 1861) (Flat-backed mangrove goby)
 Mugilogobius platystomus (Günther, 1872) (Indonesian mangrove goby)
 Mugilogobius rambaiae (H. M. Smith, 1945) (Queen of Siam goby)
 Mugilogobius rexi Larson, 2001
 Mugilogobius rivulus Larson, 2001 (Drain mangrove goby)
 Mugilogobius sarasinorum (Boulenger, 1897)  (Sarasin's mangrove goby)
 Mugilogobius stigmaticus (De Vis, 1884) (Black-spot mangrove goby)
 Mugilogobius tagala (Herre, 1927)
 Mugilogobius tigrinus Larson, 2001
 Mugilogobius wilsoni Larson, 2001 (Wilson's mangrove goby)
 Mugilogobius zebra (Aurich, 1938)

References

 
Gobionellinae
Taxa named by Fredrik Adam Smitt
Taxonomy articles created by Polbot